The rivalry between Esteghlal and Sepahan is a football rivalry played between Iranian football clubs Esteghlal Tehran and Sepahan Isfahan.

History
Since 1971–72 Iran football season, Esteghlal Tehran and Sepahan Isfahan had several meetings in Iranian League, Hazfi Cup, and friendly matches.

The first was in Local League 1971–72 in Isfahan, that Esteghlal won the match with the result of 4-0. First win for Sepahan was in Takht Jamshid Cup 1974-75 with the result of 1-0.

Before the Iranian Revolution in 1979, two football clubs met 10 times (2 times in Local League and 8 times in Takht Jamshid Cup). From these 10 meetings, each club won 4 matches and the result of 2 matches was draw.

From 1991–92 to 2000-01 Iranian Football Seasons, two clubs met 18 times (16 times in Azadegan League, and 2 times in Naghsh-Jahan Tournament in Esfahan). From these 18 meetings, Esteghlal won 8 matches and Sepahan won 5. The result of the other 5 matches was draw.

Since the establishment of Iran Pro League in 2001, two clubs met 30 times (22 times in Iran Pro League, 6 times in Hazfi Cup, once in AFC Champions League, and once in Tehran Etehadiyeh Cup). From these 30 meetings, Esteghlal won 8 matches and Sepahan won 15. The result of the other 7 matches was draw.

The best win for Esteghlal took place in the clubs first meeting in Local League 1971–72 with the score of 4-0. And the best win for Sepahan was in 2002-03 Hazfi Cup with the score of 3-0.

The highest goal-scoring match was in 2010–11 Iran Pro League with the result of 4-3 for Esteghlal.

Notable matches and seasons

2001–02 Hazfi Cup
Two football clubs faced each other in Semi-final of 2001–02 Hazfi Cup in a two-leg meeting.

The importance of this meeting for Esteghlal was that, they missed the championship of 2001–02 Iran Pro League in the last day to Persepolis and Winning the Hazfi Cup was a really high motivation for them. On the other side Sepahan, who lost both the meetings in 2001–02 Iran Pro League to Esteghlal, was really eager to compensate those two losses.

The first leg was held in Isfahan, and Sepahan could win the match with the result of 4-2. However, in the second leg in Tehran, it was Esteghlal who could win the match with the result of 3-1 in a really exciting match. Therefore, after these two dramatic and close matches, two clubs gain the score of 5–5 in total, and Esteghlal could advance into the final just because of higher number of scored-away goals.

In the final, Esteghlal also could beat Fajr Sepasi and became the champion.

A dramatic season for Sepahan (5 matches, 5 wins)

In 2002-03 Iranian Football Season, two clubs met each other 5 times, and dramatically, Sepahan could won all 5 meetings with coaching of Farhad Kazemi. From these five meetings, 2 of them were in 2002-03 Iran Pro League, 2 of them were in 2002-03 Hazfi Cup, and the last one in a four-team friendly tournament (Etehadiyeh Cup) hosted by Esteghlal.

In 2002-03 Iran Pro League, Sepahan could beat Esteghlal in both league matches in Tehran and Isfahan with the similar result of 3-2.

In the 1/8 final of 2002-03 Hazfi Cup, two clubs again faced each other in a two-leg meeting. The first leg was held in Isfahan, and Sepahan could win the match with the result of 3-0. In the second leg in Tehran, it was again Sepahan who could beat Esteghlal with the result of 1-0.

After the end of 2002-03 Iran's Football Season and before the starting of the new Iranian Football Season, a four-team friendly tournament with the name of Etehadiyeh Cup held in Tehran hosted by Esteghlal. In this tournament Esteghlal as the host, Sepahan and Pas Tehran as the champion and runner-up of 2002-03 Iran Pro League, and Al Wasl from Dubai as the guest team participated. In the Semi-final of the tournament, Seaphan and Esteghlal again faced each other and Sepahan could beat Esteghlal with the result of 3-2 and advanced to the final of the tournament. In the final, Sepahan also could beat Pas Tehran and became the champion.

Therefore, and after these five matches between the club in a single season, Sepahan could win all the matches and made a really dramatic record.

2003–04 Hazfi Cup
In 2003-04 Iran's Football Season, two football clubs reached the Final of 2003–04 Hazfi Cup.

Esteghlal by coaching of Amir Ghalenoei had a great performance in 2003–04 Iran Pro League and becoming the runner-up. On the other side, Sepahan by coaching of Farhad Kazemi did not have a successful season in 2003–04 Iran Pro League. Therefore, and before the starting of Final, Esteghlal seemed to be the favor for winning the Hazfi Cup title.

The first leg was held in Isfahan and Sepahan could win the match with the result of 3-2, in a really close and exciting match and with the final scoring of Sepahan in 90th minute of the match. By this first-leg result, Esteghlal could simply become the champion with winning the second-leg match with the result of 1-0 or 2–1.

However, the story of second-leg match was different. In the second leg in Tehran and in front of more than 85000 Esteghlal fans, it was Sepahan could perform really great and won the match with the result of 2-0. It was a really unexpected loss for Esteghlal fans and Amir Ghalenoei, due to their great performance during the league season. On the other side, it was a really dramatic win for Sepahan fans and Frahad Kazemi.

Therefore, after these two dramatic matches, Seaphan could become the champion by the total result of 5-2.

2012 AFC Champions League
At the end of 2011-12 Iran's Football Season, two football clubs met each other in the 1/8 Final of 2012 AFC Champions League.

This was the first meeting of two football clubs in an international and continental tournaments. Moreover, the fact that Sepahan was the winner of 2011–12 Iran Pro League and Esteghlal was the winner of 2011–12 Hazfi Cup, makes this match really important for both football clubs and their fans.

By winning this match, Esteghlal had the possibility to go for the first time to the Quarter-Finals of AFC Champions League since its establishment in 2002. On the other side, Sepahan's fans expected from their team to win this match and go forward for the first Asian title after three-year-in-a-row Iran's football championships.

On May 22, 2012, the match was held in Isfahan and finally Sepahan could win the match with the result of 2-0. Therefore, Sepahan advanced to Quarter-Finals of AFC Champions League for the third time in the history of the club. The Quarter-Final round will be held in September 2012.

All results

Summary of results

Total matches

Matches with competition

Competitions details

Trophies

Top goal scorers

1 Seyed-Salehi scored 5 goals as the Sepahan player and 1 goal as the Esteghlal player.

Hat-tricks 
 
A hat-trick is achieved when the same player scores three or more goals in one match. Listed in chronological order.

Most successful coaches
 Coaches in bold are still active for Esteghlal or Sepahan.

1 Hejazi obtained 2 wins as the coach of Esteghlal and 1 win as the coach of Sepahan.
* ''Ghalenoei has won 7 matches but his losses have been more.he has lost 14 matches.

See also
 Football in Iran
 Esteghlal F.C.
 Sepahan F.C.
 Tehran Derby
 El Gilano
 Isfahan Derby
 Mashhad Derby
 Persepolis F.C.–Sepahan S.C. rivalry
 Persepolis F.C.–Tractor S.C. rivalry
 Esteghlal F.C.–Tractor S.C rivalry
 Major football rivalries

References

Derby
Football derbies in Iran
Sepahan S.C.
Esteghlal F.C. matches
Sepahan S.C. matches